Dedé Mamata is a 1987  Brazilian drama film directed by Rodolfo Brandão  and starring Guilherme Fontes.

The film was entered into the main competition at the 45th edition of the Venice Film Festival. It also won the awards for Best Supporting Actor (Marcos Palmeira) and Best Supporting Actress (Iara Jamraat) at the 1988 Gramado Film Festival.

Plot

Cast  
  
Guilherme Fontes  as  Dedé Mamata
Malu Mader  as  Lena
Marcos Palmeira  as  Alpino
Luiz Fernando Guimarães  as  Cumpade
Paulo Porto  as  Avô
Iara Jamra as  Ritinha
Paulo Betti  as  Pai
Natália Thimberg  as  Avó
Geraldo Del Rey  as Carlos Marighella
Tonico Pereira  as  Dirigente comunista
Thaís de Campos  as  Young Avó 
Antônio Pitanga  as  Policial
Thelma Reston  as  Mãe de Lena

References

External links

1987 drama films
Brazilian drama films
1987 directorial debut films
1987 films
1980s Portuguese-language films